MMPC may refer to:

 Michigan Mathematics Prize Competition, a math competition held in Michigan, U.S.
 Milwaukee Motion Picture Commission, the former film censor board of the city of Milwaukee, Wisconsin, U.S.
 Mitsubishi Motors Philippines, the Philippine operation of Mitsubishi Motors Corporation
 Monday Morning Podcast, a podcast by American comedian Bill Burr
 Multimedia PC, a recommended configuration for a personal computer with a CD-ROM drive
 The gene (mmpC) and protein (MmpC) involved in biosynthesis of Mupirocin